Steve Toussaint (born 22 March 1965) is a British actor and writer.  He first gained prominence through his role in the ITV crime drama The Knock (1994–2000). As of 2022, he plays Corlys Velaryon in the HBO fantasy series House of the Dragon.

He also appeared in the films Shooting Dogs (2005) and  Prince of Persia: The Sands of Time (2010), as well as the second series of Line of Duty (2014), the ninth series of Lewis (2015), the Australian series Pine Gap (2018), and Small Axe: Red, White and Blue (2020).

Early life 
Toussaint was born in Birmingham to Barbadian parents and grew up on an estate in the New Cross area of South London, where his father worked for the London Underground and his mother worked as a nurse. His first taste of acting came in a school nativity play as a Roman Centurian in a suit of Armour made from cardboard. He studied Politics at the University of Sussex. During his time there, he was scouted for a role in a play and joined the drama society. After graduating, he briefly worked in merchant banking and hospital administration before deciding to try acting again. He took evening drama classes.

Toussaint changed his surname to Toussaint because his birth name conflicted with a pre-existing member of his actors' union. He chose the name from Toussaint Louverture, the Haitian  revolutionary leader (as at the time he had been reading about him in The Black Jacobins by C. L. R. James).

Career
Toussaint's first professional role in acting, was as the Genie in the Lamp in Aladdin at the Churchill Theatre in 1990 in a cast that included John Inman, Paul Shane, Susan Maughan, Eli Woods and David Janson. His other extensive theatre career included performances in A Doll's House at the Young Vic, Macbeth and The Merchant of Venice for the Royal Shakespeare Company, Twelfth Night at the Nottingham Playhouse, and more.

Toussaint's big break on television was starring as Barrie Christie in all 37 episodes of the ITV crime drama The Knock from 1994 to 2000. He appeared in Waking the Dead in 2002, My Dad's the Prime Minister in 2004, and Mutant Chronicles in 2008.

In 2010, Toussaint starred in the Mike Newell-directed film Prince of Persia: The Sands of Time alongside Jake Gyllenhaal, Gemma Arterton and Ben Kingsley. Toussaint appeared as CS Ray Mallick in the second season of the BBC2 police drama series Line of Duty in 2014. In 2015 he starred in Lewis, In 2018 he starred in 6 episodes of Pine Gap.

In 2022, Toussaint landed a main role of Corlys Velaryon, the head of House Velaryon, in the HBO fantasy series House of the Dragon in 2022.

Personal life
Toussaint's favourite drink is a Vodka tonic.

Filmography

Film

Television

Video games

Stage

References

External links 
 
 Steve Toussaint Official Website
 Steve Toussaint at Twitter
 Steve Toussaint at Instagram

Living people
1965 births
20th-century British male actors
21st-century British male actors
Alumni of the University of Sussex
Black British male actors
British male television actors
British male film actors
English people of Barbadian descent
Male actors from Birmingham, West Midlands
Male actors from London
People from New Cross
British male stage actors
British male video game actors